Jim Taylor (born 21 September 1944) is a retired Scottish football right half, best remembered for his time in the Scottish League with Cowdenbeath and Raith Rovers. He also played for St Mirren and Forfar Athletic.

Personal life 
Taylor worked as a joiner.

Career statistics

Honours 
Cowdenbeath

 Scottish League Second Division second-place promotion: 1969–70

Individual

Cowdenbeath Hall of Fame

References 

Scottish footballers
Cowdenbeath F.C. players
Scottish Football League players
Place of birth missing (living people)
Association football wing halves
St Johnstone F.C. players
Forfar Athletic F.C. players
St Mirren F.C. players
Raith Rovers F.C. players
1944 births
Living people